Aleppo: The Rise and Fall of Syria's Great Merchant City is a non-fiction book by Philip Mansel, published by I.B.Tauris in 2016. It concerns Aleppo and how it changed from a more prosperous and cosmopolitan city to a war-torn environment.

Contents
A history of Aleppo from 1516 to the book's publication time takes up the initial 25% while the other portions of the book are travel writing from various time periods, with many accounts written by people from the Western world.

Reception
Justin Marozzi of The Spectator wrote that the author "goes about his business in a style at once accomplished, entertaining and idiosyncratic." Marozzi concluded that the "Elegant and elegiac" book "is a precious monument to a once-splendid city that has been reduced to abject ruin and misery."

Elif Shafak of the Financial Times wrote that the author has a genuine passion for Aleppo and "offers a unique perspective on the cultures around the Mediterranean." Shafak concluded that it is "an eloquently written book that at times reads like an elegy to Aleppo’s bazaars, embracing worldview and cultural diversity."

References

External links
 Bloomsbury Publishing: UK link and US link
 Aleppo: The Rise and Fall of Syria's Great Merchant City from the Philip Mansel official website

2016 non-fiction books
Aleppo
Books about Syria
I.B. Tauris books